The 12+24 Hour Race Basel is an Ultramarathon race in Basel, Switzerland. The run takes place annually in May, organized by the Sri Chinmoy Marathon Team. It is held on the Sports Facilities St. Jakob on a 1.1 kilometer route (0.68 miles).

History 
Since 1988 the race has been held in Basel. It regularly holds the 12 and 24 hour Swiss championships, and has held the European Championships several times.

Records 
1998 Yiannis Kouros run 290.22 kilometers. It is the course record and also currently the 24-hour world record on the road. Denise Zimmermann holds the national record in 24-hour running. They improved in twice and bring him back once in Basel.

References

External links 
 ch.srichinmoyraces.org, Official website
 12+24 Hour Race 2014 in Basel, youtube.com

Sport in Basel
Sports events founded by Sri Chinmoy
Ultramarathons
Athletics competitions in Switzerland
May sporting events
Recurring sporting events established in 1988
Spring (season) events in Switzerland